Augusto Severo International Airport , formerly called Parnamirim Airport, was the airport that served Natal, Brazil, located in the adjoining municipality of Parnamirim.

On May 31, 2014, all domestic and international flights were moved to the new Gov. Aluízio Alves International Airport, and Augusto Severo was closed to civil aviation.

Some of its facilities were shared with the Natal Air Force Base of the Brazilian Air Force. From 24 November 1951, the airport was named after the aviator Augusto Severo de Albuquerque Maranhão (1864-1902).

History

Before World War II Air France operated a mail service with flying boats and landplanes across the Atlantic from Dakar which routed via Natal. Parnamirim was a combination land and marine airport also used by Pan American World Airways and Panair do Brasil flying boats. In 1940 and 1941 the Italian Airline L.A.T.I. operated a weekly landplane service from Rome to Rio de Janeiro via Recife (mainly southbound) and Natal (mainly northbound) using Savoia-Marchetti tri-motor landplanes until the aircraft were impounded and the service stopped as a result of the intervention of the British secret services in the Americas around the time of the Attack on Pearl Harbor.

The airport gained an important role during World War II as a strategic base for aircraft flying between South America and West Africa. Particularly between 1943 and 1945, this facility was used jointly by the Brazilian Air Force, United States Army, United States Navy, the Royal Air Force, and commercial airlines. The maintenance and security installations were made by the U.S. Army in the South Atlantic (USAFSA).

On 31 March 1980, the Ministry of Aeronautics transferred to state-owned airport administrator Infraero the task of managing the airport. On the same date major renovations were completed.

In 2000, the last passenger terminal was built. The terminal was 11,560 m2 (124,431 sq.ft.), had four jet bridges, and was capable of handling 1.5 million passengers annually. There were 500 parking places.

On 31 August 2009, Infraero unveiled an ambitious BRL5.3 billion (US$2.8 billion; EUR2.0 billion) investment plan to renovate and upgrade airports of ten cities focusing on the preparations for the 2014 FIFA World Cup, which was going to be held in Brazil. On that occasion, it was announced that even though Natal was one of the venue cities, the plan did not include Augusto Severo airport because renovations had been recently completed, and Infraero considered the airport fit to handle the forthcoming increase in traffic.

However, the capacity of the airport did not meet the demand of passengers, so the brand-new Greater Natal International Airport was built at the nearby town of São Gonçalo do Amarante. On 31 May 2014, all domestic flights were moved to the new facility. International flights were moved a few days later. The facilities of Augusto Severo are now used only by Natal Air Force Base.

The following airlines served the airport at the time of closure: Arkefly, Avianca Brasil, Azul Brazilian Airlines, Gol Airlines, TAM Airlines, and TAP Portugal.

Accidents and incidents
11 June 1947: Flota Aérea Mercante Argentina, an Avro 691 Lancastrian registration LV-ACS flying from Buenos Aires to Natal struck a post on landing and caught fire. Of the 18 passengers and crew, 13 survived.

Access

See also

Natal Air Force Base

References

External links

Augusto Severo International Airport Photo Archive at airliners.net
 LIFE photo L.A.T.I Savoia-Marchetti SM.82 arrives while field being improved for U.S.
 LIFE photo DC-2/DC-3 ferrying by PAA to British by old Air France hangar Parnamarim
 LIFE photo DC-2/DC-3 ferrying by PAA to British by L.A.T.I hangars Parnamarim
 LIFE photo Pan American Boeing 314 Clipper at Natal Marine terminal

Defunct airports in Brazil
Natal, Rio Grande do Norte
Airports disestablished in 2014
2014 disestablishments in Brazil